Georgios Theocharis (born 30 June 2002) is a Greek professional footballer who plays as a goalkeeper for Super League club AEK Athens.

References

2002 births
Living people
Greek footballers
AEK Athens F.C. players
Super League Greece players
Super League Greece 2 players
Association football goalkeepers
21st-century Greek people